Mary Ellen Rudin (December 7, 1924 – March 18, 2013) was an American mathematician known for her work in set-theoretic topology. In 2013, Elsevier established the Mary Ellen Rudin Young Researcher Award, which is awarded annually to a young researcher, mainly in fields adjacent to general topology.

Early life and education 

Mary Ellen (Estill) Rudin was born in Hillsboro, Texas to Joe Jefferson Estill and Irene (Shook) Estill. Her mother Irene was an English teacher before marriage, and her father Joe was a civil engineer.  The family moved with her father's work, but spent a great deal of Mary Ellen's childhood around Leakey, Texas. She had one sibling, a younger brother.  Both of Rudin's maternal grandmothers had attended Mary Sharp College near their hometown of Winchester, Tennessee.  Rudin remarks on this legacy and how much her family valued education in an interview.

She attended the University of Texas, completing her B.A. in 1944 after just three years before moving into the graduate program in mathematics under Robert Lee Moore. Her graduate thesis presented a counterexample to one of "Moore's axioms". She completed her Ph.D. in 1949.

During her time as an undergraduate, she was a member of the Phi Mu Women's Fraternity,   and was elected to the Phi Beta Kappa society.

In 1953, she married mathematician Walter Rudin, whom she met while teaching at Duke University. They had four children.

Career 
At the beginning of her career, Rudin taught at Duke University and the University of Rochester. She took a position as Lecturer at the University of Wisconsin in 1959, and was appointed Professor of Mathematics in 1971.  After her retirement in 1991, she continued to serve as a Professor Emerita. She was the first Grace Chisholm Young Professor of Mathematics and also held the Hilidale Professorship,.

She was an Invited Speaker of the International Congress of Mathematicians in 1974 in Vancouver. She served as vice-president of the American Mathematical Society, 1980–1981.  In 1984 she was selected to be a Noether Lecturer. She was an honorary member of the Hungarian Academy of Sciences (1995). In 2012 she became a fellow of the American Mathematical Society.

Rudin is best known in topology for her constructions of counterexamples to well-known conjectures.  In 1958, she found an unshellable triangulation of the tetrahedron. Most famously, Rudin was the first to construct a Dowker space, which she did in 1971, thus disproving a conjecture of Clifford Hugh Dowker that had stood, and helped drive topological research, for more than twenty years. Her example fueled the search for "small" ZFC Dowker spaces.  She also proved the first Morita conjecture and a restricted version of the second. Her last major result was a proof of Nikiel's conjecture. Early proofs that every metric space is paracompact were somewhat involved, but Rudin provided an elementary one.

"Reading the articles of Mary Ellen Rudin, studying them until there is no mystery takes hours and hours; but those hours are rewarded, the student obtains power to which few have access. They are not hard to read, they are just hard mathematics, that's all." (Steve Watson)

Later life 
Rudin resided in Madison, Wisconsin, in the Rudin House, a home designed by architect Frank Lloyd Wright. She died aged 88 on March 18, 2013.

See also 
 Rudin–Keisler ordering

Publications

Mary Ellen Rudin Young Researcher Award 
The Mary Ellen Rudin Young Researcher Award is an annual award given to young researchers in general topology and its related fields. It was established in 2013 by Elsevier on behalf of the journal Topology and its Applications and consists of $15,000 USD that must be used by the awardee in the following way: $5,000 USD for three major conferences in topology, $5,000 USD for visiting a research center, and $5,000 USD, which can be used freely and is regarded as a cash prize.

The prize was named after Mary Ellen Rudin, one of the most prominent topologists in the 20th century. Mary Ellen gave her permission to use her name for the award but unfortunately passed away before the first prize was awarded.

List of awardees

Recognition 
She is included in a deck of playing cards featuring notable women mathematicians published by the Association of Women in Mathematics.

References

External links

Further reading

External links

 
 "Mary Ellen Rudin", Biographies of Women Mathematicians, Agnes Scott College
 

1924 births
2013 deaths
University of Texas at Austin College of Natural Sciences alumni
University of Wisconsin–Madison faculty
20th-century American mathematicians
21st-century American mathematicians
Members of the Hungarian Academy of Sciences
Fellows of the American Mathematical Society
American women mathematicians
Topologists
20th-century American women scientists
Mathematicians from Texas
People from Hillsboro, Texas
People from Real County, Texas
People from Madison, Wisconsin
20th-century women mathematicians
21st-century women mathematicians
Mathematics awards
Academic awards
21st-century American women